Paope Nature Reserve is a nature reserve situated on Hiiumaa island in western Estonia, in Hiiu County.

The nature reserve is situated in an area of geological variation and was created to protect the biodiversity of the area. Hiiumaa's highest point (68 metres above sea level) is located in the nature reserve.

References

Nature reserves in Estonia
Geography of Hiiu County